The Coptic Orthodox Diocese of the Southern United States is a diocese of the Coptic Orthodox Church of Alexandria located in the United States of America and encompassing the states of Alabama,  Arkansas, Florida, Georgia, Louisiana, Mississippi, Oklahoma, Tennessee and Texas.

History 
The Coptic Orthodox Diocese of the Southern United States was established in 1993 by Pope Shenouda III of Alexandria in response to the growing number of Coptic Orthodox Churches abroad. was the first Coptic Orthodox Diocese to be established in the United States.

Scandals

Child sexual abuse 

On July 14th 2020, after public declarations by a victim, Priest Reweis Aziz Khalil (Now: Yousef Aziz Khalil) was exposed as a pedophile and later defrocked. Khalil was an Egyptian Priest sent to assist the service in several churches. Reports show that he was reported repeatedly throughout the years for assaulting several girls and women in the diocese under the guise of the sacrament of confession. Khalil was moved to another diocese following the discovery. He was also investigated in an interior investigation within the Church, and was removed from the priesthood in 2014; however he managed to continue working as a priest.

Statistics

Parishes and schools 
As of 2015, the Diocese of the Southern United States operates 64 parishes. However, only 38 of these of formal churches, the other 28 are categorized as communities, which means that they are congregations, and usually possess a church building, but are not full churches yet in that they are not large enough by diocesan standards to be recognized as churches. Communities are served by a visiting priest from a recognized church.

Schools 
The diocese currently operates one school, and religious education is provided to children in the form of Sunday School classes at local Coptic churches.

Publications 
The Diocese of the Southern United States publishes three magazines.

Bishops 
 Bishop Youssef (1993–present)

References 

Coptic Orthodox Church in the United States
Oriental Orthodox dioceses in the United States